Large plaque parapsoriasis  are skin lesions that may be included in the modern scheme of cutaneous conditions described as parapsoriasis. They can be very thin plaques that are asymptomatic or mildly pruritic. Large-plaque parapsoriasis is a common associate of retiform parapsoriasis, can be accompanied by poikiloderma vasculare atrophicans, and can in rare occasions be a precursor to cutaneous T-cell lymphoma.

Cause

Diagnosis

Treatment 
Parapsoriasis treatment consists primarily of light therapy (more specifically PUVA therapy or UVB therapy) possibly in combination with topical steroids. 
 Large plaque parapsoriasis is usually a chronic condition that needs long-term treatment.

See also 
 List of cutaneous conditions
 Mycosis fungoides

References

External links 

Lymphoid-related cutaneous conditions